Antsirabe Nord or Antsirabe Avaratra is a rural municipality in northern Madagascar. It belongs to the district of Vohemar, which is a part of Sava Region. The population of the commune was estimated to be approximately 25,000 in 2001 commune census.

Primary and junior level secondary education are available. The majority 99% of the population of the commune are farmers.  The most important crop is vanilla, while other important products are coffee, pepper and rice.  Services provide employment for 1% of the population.

Geography
This municipality is situated on the National Road 5a between Vohemar and Sambava.

References 

Populated places in Sava Region